Sparganothoides polymitariana is a species of moth of the family Tortricidae. It is found in Costa Rica. The habitat consists of secondary forests.

The length of the forewings is about 7.4 mm. The ground colour of the forewings is yellowish brown with a greyish tinge basally. The hindwings are yellowish grey basally and near the anal angle and grey beyond. Adults have been recorded on wing in January.

Etymology
The species name is derived from Latin polymitarius (meaning highly wrought or finished).

References

Moths described in 2009
Sparganothoides